Roy E. Radu (born September 11, 1963 in Burnaby, British Columbia) is a former Canadian national rugby player of Romanian descent. He played as a flanker, and played for the Canadian national team in the 1987 and 1991 Rugby World Cups.

In 1988 he was the recipient of the Bobby Gaul Memorial Trophy an award presented by the University of British Columbia to the graduating male athlete who best combines the qualities of leadership and sportsmanship.

In 2018, Radu was inducted into the BC Sports Hall of Fame as a member of the 1991 Rugby World Cup Canadian team.

References

External links 

1991 World Cup Team Honoured by BC Sports Hall of Fame. IndependentSportsNews.com

1963 births
Living people
Sportspeople from Burnaby
Canadian rugby union players
Canada international rugby union players
Rugby union flankers
Canadian people of Romanian descent
University of British Columbia alumni
People educated at Otago Boys' High School